The 3D Core Graphics System (a.k.a. Core) was the very first graphical standard ever developed.  A group of 25 experts of the ACM Special Interest Group SIGGRAPH developed this "conceptual framework".  The specifications were published in 1977 and it became a foundation for many future developments in the field of computer graphics.

External links 
 The History of Computer Graphics Standards Development
 History of Computer Graphics

Graphics standards